Gobodo is a surname. Notable people with the surname include:

 Nonkululeko Gobodo (born 1960), South African businesswoman
 Pumla Gobodo-Madikizela (born 1955), South African psychologist

Surnames of African origin